Deo-Gratias-Nicolas Godinot (1 May 1765 – 27 October 1811) was a Général de Division of the First French Empire who saw action during the Peninsular War.  He was made Chef de Brigade of the 25th Légère on 30 June 1799 and rose to become Colonel of that regiment in 1803.  Godinot gained promotion to Général de Brigade on 1 February 1805, and on 10 May 1811 rose further to Général de Division.  He led his brigade in a feint-attack against the village of Albuera during the Battle of Albuera on 16 May 1811. He defeated a Spanish force at the Battle of Zujar on 9 August 1811. Godinot was made the scapegoat for an operation that failed to trap Francisco Ballesteros in the autumn of 1811. Despondent, Godinot killed himself.

Aside from his military rank, Godinot became a Commander of the Légion d'Honneur on 9 March 1806, and was made a Baron of the Empire on 27 July 1808.

References 
;

1765 births
1811 deaths
French military personnel of the Napoleonic Wars
Suicides in France
French military personnel who committed suicide